Eagles is a 1984 Iranian film about an Iranian pilot, Yadollah Sharifirad, whose aircraft shot down by Iraqi Air Force during Iran–Iraq War. The story is about his escape back to Iran. This movie is considered the first major war movie in Iranian cinema. It is estimated that 18 percent of Iranian population watched the movie at the time.

Cast 
 Saeed Rad
 Jamshid Hashempour
 Zari Broumand
 Shahab Asgari
 Reza Rooygari
 Morteza Nikkhah
 Behzad Rahimkhani

Release

References

External links 
 

1984 films
1980s war films
Iran–Iraq War films
Iranian war films
Historical action films
Films directed by Samuel Khachikian